Robert Lucien Chapuis (4 April 1935 in Vescemont – 8 March 2009) was a French clergyman and prelate for the Roman Catholic Diocese of Mananjary. He was appointed bishop in 1968. He resigned in 1973, and died in 2009.

References 

1935 births
2009 deaths
French Roman Catholic bishops